Sudheera de Zoysa (born 8 October 1984) is a Sri Lankan former cricketer. He played in 29 first-class and 38 List A matches between 2001/02 and 2009/10. He made his Twenty20 debut on 17 August 2004, for Nondescripts Cricket Club in the 2004 SLC Twenty20 Tournament. He is one of only a handful of bowlers who have taken four wickets without conceding a run in a first-class match.

References

External links
 

1984 births
Living people
Sri Lankan cricketers
Moratuwa Sports Club cricketers
Nondescripts Cricket Club cricketers